Großer Plessower See is a German lake in the town of Werder, in Brandenburg. At an elevation of 24 m, its surface area is 3.22 km², its maximum length  5,11 km and, at its widest, is 1325 m.

External links

Lakes of Brandenburg
Potsdam-Mittelmark